Malbork railway station is the main railway station of the town of Malbork, Poland. The station is connected to various cities in Poland via PKP Express Intercity Premium (EIP), Intercity (IC), and Twoje Linie Kolejowe (TLK) services, and various regional cities via Polregio service.

History
The station opened on 1852, when the town was located in the Prussian Partition of Poland, since 1871 part of Germany. It served as a border station on the German side between Free City of Danzig and Germany in the interwar period, and it passed to Poland with the conclusion of World War II.

Train services
The station is served by the following service(s):

Express Intercity Premium services (EIP) Gdynia - Warsaw
Express Intercity Premium services (EIP) Gdynia - Warsaw - Katowice - Gliwice/Bielsko-Biała
Express Intercity Premium services (EIP) Gdynia/Kołobrzeg - Warsaw - Kraków (- Rzeszów)
 Intercity services (IC) Łódź Fabryczna — Warszawa — Gdańsk Glowny — Kołobrzeg
Intercity services (IC) Szczecin - Koszalin - Słupsk - Gdynia - Gdańsk - Malbork - via Elbląg - Olsztyn
Intercity services (IC) Szczecin - Koszalin - Słupsk - Gdynia - Gdańsk - Malbork - via Iława - Olsztyn
Intercity services (IC) Szczecin - Koszalin - Słupsk - Gdynia - Gdańsk - Elbląg - Olsztyn - Białystok
Intercity services (TLK) Gdynia Główna — Zakopane 
Intercity services (TLK) Kołobrzeg — Gdynia Główna — Warszawa Wschodnia — Kraków Główny
Regional services (R) Iława Główna — Malbork 
Regional services (R) Malbork — Słupsk  
Regional services (R) Malbork — Gdynia Chylonia 
Regional services (R) Gdynia Chylonia — Olsztyn Główny
Regional services (R) Elbląg — Gdynia Chylonia 
Regional services (R) Grudziądz — Tczew
Regional services (R) Grudziądz — Malbork
Regional services (R) Kwidzyn — Tczew
Regional services (R) Kwidzyn — Malbork

See also
Rail transport in Poland

References 

Railway stations in Poland opened in 1852
Railway stations in Pomeranian Voivodeship
Railway stations served by Przewozy Regionalne InterRegio